Hugh Rutherford Wyllie (born 11 October 1934) is a Scottish Presbyterian minister. From 1992 to 1993, he served as Moderator of the General Assembly of the Church of Scotland. He also served as Minister of Dunbeth Church, Coatbridge from 1965 to 1972, of Cathcart South Church, Glasgow from 1972 to 1981, and of the Old Parish Church, Hamilton from 1981 to 2000.

Early life and education
Wyllie was born on 11 October 1934 to Hugh McPhee Wyllie and Elizabeth Buchanan. He was educated at Shawlands Academy and Hutchesons' Boys' Grammar School; both in Glasgow, Scotland.

From 1953 to 1955, Wyllie undertook his national service in the Royal Air Force. Because he had accrued extra hours, he was demobbed two days before his two years of compulsory service were due to be completed. Two days later, on what should have been his last day of service, the plane he had served on crashed into the sea, killing all those on board.

References

1934 births
Living people
Moderators of the General Assembly of the Church of Scotland
20th-century Ministers of the Church of Scotland
Royal Air Force personnel
People educated at Hutchesons' Grammar School
People educated at Shawlands Academy